Kilauea Elementary School, also known as Kilauea School, on Kolo Rd. in Kilauea, Hawaii, on Kauai, is a public elementary school operated by the Hawaii Department of Education. It occupies a historic school building that was founded in 1882 and known as an "English School".

It was located on the edge of the former Kilauea Plantation community.  The three buildings are a U-shaped administration-classrooms building, a cafeteria, and a teacher's cottage.  A big lawn in front of the three buildings is crossed by a circular driveway.  The main building was designed by County Department of Public Works' architect John Waiamau, and the others were designed by Tai King Leong.

The complex was deemed significant for NRHP listing "as a typical rural schoolhouse on the
island of Kauai and for its associations with the development of public
education in the town of Kilauea."

References

External links
 Kilauea School

School buildings on the National Register of Historic Places in Hawaii
School buildings completed in 1922
Public schools in Kauai County, Hawaii
Public elementary schools in Hawaii
1882 establishments in Hawaii
National Register of Historic Places in Kauai County, Hawaii